Dommary-Baroncourt is a commune in the Meuse department in Grand Est in north-eastern France.

Geography
The river Othain flows northwestward through the commune and crosses the village.

See also
Communes of the Meuse department

References

Dommarybaroncourt